Oxychilus basajauna is a species of land snail in the family Oxychilidae. It is native to Spain.

References

Oxychilus
Molluscs of Europe
Gastropods described in 1990
Taxonomy articles created by Polbot